Johnson Onuoha is an Anglican bishop in Nigeria: he is the current Bishop of Arochukwu/Ohafia, one of nine within the Anglican Province of Aba, itself one of 14 provinces within the Church of Nigeria.

Notes

Living people
Anglican bishops of Arochukwu/Ohafia
21st-century Anglican bishops in Nigeria
Year of birth missing (living people)